The Episcopal Church of All Angels is a historic church at 129 W. Michigan in Spearfish, South Dakota. It was built in 1895 and was added to the National Register in 1976.

Before the building of the only Episcopal church in Spearfish, Episcopalian worshippers practiced in their homes. The great-granddaughter of Alexander Hamilton donated money for a church to be built as a tribute to her great-grandfather, although she never visited Spearfish. After the sandstone church as built in 1895, it was damaged on the interior by a fire, and Ms. Hamilton sent money to repair the church. Additionally, Ms. Hamilton sent Christmas gifts to children for Sunday school.

References

Episcopal churches in South Dakota
Churches on the National Register of Historic Places in South Dakota
Victorian architecture in South Dakota
Churches completed in 1895
Churches in Lawrence County, South Dakota
19th-century Episcopal church buildings
National Register of Historic Places in Lawrence County, South Dakota
Spearfish, South Dakota